Billy Bostock (7 August 1943 – 1996) was a Scottish football forward who played in the Scottish League for Cowdenbeath.

Honours
Cowdenbeath

 Scottish League Second Division second-place promotion: 1969–70

Individual

Cowdenbeath Hall of Fame

References

1942 births
Scottish footballers
Association football forwards
People from Inverkeithing
Cowdenbeath F.C. players
Association football utility players
Scottish Football League players
1996 deaths
Lochgelly Albert F.C. players